Michael Steven Ovitz (born December 14, 1946) is an American businessman, investor, and philanthropist. He was a talent agent who co-founded Creative Artists Agency (CAA) in 1975 and served as its chairman until 1995. Ovitz later served as president of The Walt Disney Company for only 16 months, from October 1995 to January 1997.

Early life and education
Ovitz was born to a Romanian Jewish family in Chicago, Illinois, the son of a liquor wholesaler. Raised in Encino, California, he was student body president at Birmingham High School in Van Nuys, a classmate of Sally Field and Michael Milken. While a pre-med student at the University of California, Los Angeles and president of Zeta Beta Tau, he began his entertainment career as a part-time tour guide at Universal Studios.

Career 
Upon graduating from UCLA, in 1968, with a degree in theater, film, and television, Ovitz secured a job in the mailroom at the William Morris Agency. From there, he left for law school, but returned shortly (something William Morris normally did not allow). He was soon promoted, eventually becoming a highly successful television agent. Six years later, he and four other young colleagues left William Morris to found Creative Artists Agency.

Creative Artists Agency
Dissatisfied with his pay and promotion opportunities, Ovitz and fellow William Morris agents Ronald Meyer, William Haber, Rowland Perkins, and Michael S. Rosenfeld planned to form their own agency after raising money. Learning of their plans, William Morris fired them in January 1975. Borrowing $21,000 from a bank, the agents rented a small office, conducting business on card tables and rented chairs, their wives taking turns as agency receptionist.

Ovitz reportedly had three new film packaging deals sold in the first week. Within four years CAA had $90.2 million in annual bookings and was the third-largest Hollywood agency. Under his direction, CAA quickly grew from a start-up organization to the world's leading talent agency, expanding from television into film, investment banking, and advertising. Ovitz was known for assembling package deals, wherein CAA would utilize its talent base to provide directors, actors and screenwriters to a studio, thus shifting the negotiating leverage from the studios to the talent. As CAA rose in stature Ovitz became one of the most powerful men in Hollywood; he was so influential that, when The New York Times wrote about him in 1989, industry executives, directors, and actors refused to comment or would only do so if CAA allowed it.

Promoted to president, then to chairman of the board, Ovitz's roles at CAA were numerous. He served as talent agent to Hollywood actors Tom Cruise, Dustin Hoffman, Kevin Costner, John Belushi, Michael Douglas, Bill Murray, Sylvester Stallone, and Barbra Streisand, as well as directors Steven Spielberg, Barry Levinson, and Sydney Pollack. He also provided corporate consulting services, helping negotiate several major international business mergers and deals including Matsushita's acquisition of MCA/Universal, the financial rescue of MGM/United Artists, and Sony's acquisition of Columbia Pictures. Ovitz's signing of Coca-Cola as a CAA client from agency McCann-Erickson had a significant impact on the advertising industry. He negotiated David Letterman's move from NBC to CBS, chronicled in the book The Late Shift: Letterman, Leno, and the Network Battle for the Night by Bill Carter. He disliked publicity, however, with the Times reporting that "Ovitz is one of the very few people in the world who own almost all the photographs ever taken of them".

Disney

Ovitz resigned from CAA in 1995 to become president of The Walt Disney Company under chairman Michael Eisner. Ovitz quickly grew frustrated with his role in the company and vague definition of duties. After a tumultuous year as Eisner's second in command, he was dismissed by Eisner in January 1997 and left Disney with a (previously agreed-upon) severance package valued at $38 million in cash and an estimated $100 million in stock.

Disney shareholders later sued Eisner and Disney's board of directors for awarding Ovitz such a large severance package. Later court proceedings reflect that Ovitz's stock options were granted when he was hired to induce him to join the company, not granted when he was fired. In 2005 the court upheld Disney's payment.

Artist Management Group and controversy 
In January 1999, Ovitz formed CKE, comprising four distinct companies: Artist Management Group (AMG), Artist Production Group (APG), Artist Television Group (ATG) and Lynx Technology Group (LTG). In 2002 Ovitz sold AMG to Jeff Kwatinetz for an undisclosed amount, which was merged into his management group The Firm.

After the sale of AMG, Ovitz became the subject of controversy for remarks made in a Vanity Fair interview, wherein he blamed the downfall of AMG upon a cabal led by Dreamworks cofounder David Geffen which Ovitz described as the "gay mafia". In addition to Geffen, the list included The New York Times correspondent Bernard Weinraub, Disney chairman (and former employer) Michael Eisner; Bryan Lourd, Kevin Huvane, and Richard Lovett, partners at CAA, Universal Studios president Ronald Meyer (Ovitz's former partner at CAA); and Vivendi CEO Barry Diller. "If I were to establish the foundation of the negativity", Ovitz stated, "it all comes down to David Geffen and Bernie Weinraub. Everything comes back to those two. It's the same group [quoted] in every article." He later apologized for his Vanity Fair comments.

Personal life
Ovitz acts as a private investor who has informally advised the career of Martin Scorsese. Active in philanthropy, he donated $25 million in 1999 to spearhead fund raising efforts for UCLA's Medical Center, and has contributed significantly to numerous other philanthropic endeavors. A private investor and businessman, his notable activities have ranged from attempts to bring an NFL team to the Los Angeles Coliseum to ventures in online media.

Ovitz is considered among the world's top 200 art collectors. He owns works by Pablo Picasso, Jasper Johns, Willem de Kooning, Barnett Newman, Mark Rothko, and many others.

He married Judy Reich whom he met in college; they have three children, including New York fashion designer Kimberly Ovitz.

In 2015, Ovitz became engaged to Tamara Mellon despite still being legally married to his wife Judy.

Books 
Who is Michael Ovitz? was a memoir published by Michael Ovitz recounting his time at the Creative Artists Agency (CAA) and his brief stint at The Walt Disney Company.

References

External links

Michael Ovitz Biography Yahoo! Movies
Michael Ovitz, American Media Executive (Museum of Broadcast Communications)

Charlie Rose: An Hour With Michael Ovitz About the Entertainment Industry
Michael Ovitz: Ad Age Advertising Century
Marc Andreessen Interviews Michael Ovitz
Michael Ovitz: L.A. Times Article on Art Collection
Mike Ovitz People Magazine
Mike Ovitz Time Magazine

1946 births
Living people
20th-century American businesspeople
21st-century American businesspeople
American chief executives in the media industry
American investors
American mass media company founders
American talent agents
Hollywood talent agents
American people of Romanian-Jewish descent
Businesspeople from Chicago
Businesspeople from Los Angeles
Disney executives
Jewish American art collectors
Jewish American philanthropists 
UCLA Film School alumni
Philanthropists from Illinois
Birmingham High School alumni
California Democrats